Donal Conor David Dermot Donat Cruise O'Brien (3 November 1917 – 18 December 2008), often nicknamed "The Cruiser", was an Irish diplomat, politician, writer, historian and academic, who served as Minister for Posts and Telegraphs from 1973 to 1977, a Senator for Dublin University from 1977 to 1979, a Teachta Dála (TD) for the Dublin North-East constituency from 1969 to 1977, and a Member of the European Parliament (MEP) from January 1973 to March 1973.

His opinion of Britain's role in Ireland subsequent to the partition of the island and the independence of the Free State in 1921 changed during the 1970s, in response to the outbreak of The Troubles. He now saw opposing nationalist and unionist traditions as irreconcilable, and switched from a nationalist to a unionist view of Irish politics and history, and from opposition to support for partition. Cruise O'Brien's outlook was radical and seldom orthodox. He summarised his position as intending "to administer an electric shock to the Irish psyche".

Internationally, though a long-standing member of the Irish Anti-Apartheid Movement, he opposed in person the African National Congress's academic boycott of the apartheid regime in South Africa. Views that he espoused during and after the 1970s contrasted with those he articulated during the 1950s and 1960s.

During his 1945–61 career as a civil servant, Cruise O'Brien promoted the government's anti-partition campaign. In the 1960s he was associated with the 'New Left' and opposition to US military involvement in Viet Nam. At the 1969 general election he was elected to Dáil Éireann as a Labour Party TD for Dublin North-East. He served as Minister for Posts and Telegraphs, with responsibility for broadcasting, between 1973 and 1977 in a coalition government. During those years he was also the Labour Party's Northern Ireland spokesman. Cruise O'Brien was later known primarily as an author and as an Irish Independent and Sunday Independent columnist.

Early life
Conor Cruise O'Brien was born at 44 Leinster Road, Rathmines, Dublin, to Francis ("Frank") Cruise O'Brien and the former Kathleen Sheehy. Frank was a journalist with the Freeman's Journal and Irish Independent newspapers, and had edited an essay written 50 years earlier by William Lecky concerning the influence of the clergy on Irish politics. Kathleen was a teacher of the Irish language. She was the daughter of David Sheehy, a member of the Irish Parliamentary Party and organiser of the Irish National Land League. She had three sisters, Hanna, Margaret and Mary. Hanna's husband, the well-known pacifist and supporter of women's suffrage Francis Sheehy-Skeffington, was executed by firing squad on the orders of Captain J.C Bowen Colthurst during the 1916 Easter Rising. Soon afterwards Mary's husband, Thomas Kettle, an officer of the Royal Dublin Fusiliers in the First World War, was killed during the Battle of the Somme. These women, Hanna and Kathleen in particular, were a major influence on Cruise O'Brien's upbringing, alongside Hanna's son, Owen Sheehy-Skeffington.

Cruise O'Brien's father died in 1927. He wanted Conor educated, like Conor's cousin Owen, in Sandford Park School that had a predominantly Protestant ethos, a wish Kathleen honoured. despite objections from Catholic clergy. Cruise O'Brien subsequently attended Trinity College Dublin, which played the British national anthem until 1939. While others stood, he and Sheehy-Skeffington sat in protest on such occasions. Cruise O'Brien was elected a scholar in Modern Languages at Trinity in 1937 and was editor of Trinity's weekly, TCD: A College Miscellany.

His first wife, Christine Foster, from a Belfast Presbyterian family, was, like her father, a member of the Gaelic League. Her parents, Alexander (Alec) Roulston Foster and Anne (Annie) Lynd, were, in Cruise O'Brien's description, "Home Rulers; a very advanced position for any Protestants in the period". Alec Foster was at the time headmaster of Belfast Royal Academy; he was later a founding member of the Wolfe Tone Society, and was a strong supporter of the Irish Anti-Apartheid movement. He was a former Ulster, Ireland and British & Irish Lions rugby player, having captained Ireland three times between 1912 and 1914. Cruise O'Brien and Christine Foster were married in a registry office in 1939. The couple had three children: Donal, Fedelma, and Kathleen (Kate), who died in 1998. The marriage ended in divorce after 20 years.

In 1962, Cruise O'Brien married the Irish-language writer and poet Máire Mhac an tSaoi in a Roman Catholic church. Cruise O'Brien's divorce, though contrary to Roman Catholic teaching, was not an issue because that church did not recognise the validity of his 1939 civil wedding. He referred to this action, which in effect formally de-recognised the legitimacy of his former wife and their children, as "hypocritical … and otherwise distasteful, but I took it, as preferable to the alternatives". Mac an tSaoi was five years his junior, and the daughter of Seán MacEntee, who was Tánaiste (deputy prime minister) at the time. The couple subsequently adopted two children of Irish-African parentage, a son (Patrick) and a daughter (Margaret).

Department of External Affairs
Cruise O'Brien's university education led to a career in the public service, most notably in the Department of External Affairs. He achieved distinction as managing director of the state-run Irish News Agency and later as part of the fledgling Irish delegation to the United Nations. He later claimed he was something of an anomalous iconoclast in post-1922 Irish politics, particularly in the context of Fianna Fáil governments under Éamon de Valera.

Cruise O'Brien wrote that the then Secretary of the department, Joseph P. Walshe, might well have considered that  Cruise O'Brien was "no fit person to be a member of Catholic Ireland's Department of External Affairs". Cruise O'Brien attributed his appointment "to a decision taken at a higher level. Under God, there was only one higher level. This consisted of Eamon de Valera, then Minister for External Affairs as well as Taoiseach." Cruise O'Brien speculated that de Valera's Catholicism may have been conditioned by his excommunication during the Civil War of 1922/3, that he may have felt that Walshe had been too close to the previous government, and that he may have been conscious of the nationalist credentials of the Sheehy family, notably Cruise O'Brien's great-uncle, Father Eugene Sheehy, who had been parish priest of Bruree during de Valera's formative years. De Valera later wrote of Father Sheehy, "" (It was he who taught me patriotism).

Cruise O'Brien wrote of his entry into the public service: "The time when I joined the Department of Finance was the first time, since my First Communion, that I found myself in a working environment which was mainly – indeed almost entirely - Catholic". As he admitted, his non-belief did not impede his career, which ended at ambassadorial level. He observed,

In the Department of External Affairs, during the 1948–51 inter-party government, he served under Seán MacBride, son of John MacBride and Maud Gonne, republican and former IRA Chief of Staff, who would become the 1974 Nobel Peace Laureate. Cruise O'Brien was particularly vocal in opposition to partition during the 1940s and 1950s, as part of his official duties.

Secondment in Congo
He came to prominence in 1961, after his secondment from Ireland's UN delegation as a special representative to Dag Hammarskjöld, Secretary General of the United Nations, in the Katanga region of the newly independent Congo (now the Democratic Republic of the Congo). Cruise O'Brien accused a combination of British, French and white Rhodesian elements of attempting to partition off Katanga as a pro-Western client state. He used military force to oppose a combination of western mercenaries and Katangan forces. 

Cruise O'Brien arrived in Élisabethville (modern Lubumbashi) on 14 June 1961, making him the UN's point man for dealing with Moïse Tshombe, the leader of the self-proclaimed independent État du Katanga. The Kasai Baluba people who formed the majority of the people in northern Katanga were solid supporters of a united Congo, and were the subjects of a ruthless campaign of repression waged by the white mercenaries hired by Tshombe, together with the Katangese gendarmerie. The UN refugee camps were soon overcrowded with thousands of Kasai Baluba people who fled into the refugee camps for their safety. From the viewpoint of O'Brien and other UN personnel, the sooner the crisis was ended, the sooner the refugees could go home. On 28 August 1961, Operation Rumpunch was launched to remove the mercenaries from Katanga as the first step towards reintegrating Katanga into the Congo. On 11 September, Mahmoud Khiary, the chief of the UN mission, gave O'Brien orders to arrest several leading figures within the Etat du Katanga. On 13 September 1961, Operation Morthor was launched, which led Cruise O'Brien to assert prematurely at a press conference that the secession of Katanga was at an end. Tshombe was ordered to be arrested, but he was able to escape via the British consul in Élisabethville to the British colony of Northern Rhodesia (modern Zambia) from whence he returned to Katanga.

Siege of Jadotville

In September 1961, a company of 155 Irish UN troops ("A" Company, 35th Battalion, Irish Army), was surrounded by a force of heavily armed Gendarmerie and mercenaries outnumbering them 20-to-one in Jadotville. The Irish soldiers, many of them still in their teens, were lightly armed, short of ammunition and supplies, and unprepared for the situation. They had been sent to the newly independent Republic of Congo on what was supposed to be a peacekeeping mission but were ordered to the offensive by the UN's most senior diplomat on the ground, Cruise O'Brien acting on the instructions of the Secretary General, who wanted the Katanga problem solved before the upcoming United Nations General Assembly, as his career was on the line.

The Irish troops held out for six days before they ran out of bullets and drinking water. When water finally reached them, it came in old petrol cans that had not been cleaned, making it undrinkable. The troops inflicted heavy casualties on the enemy force but suffered no fatalities themselves. After their surrender, they spent just over one month in captivity unsure of their fate, and when they arrived back in Ireland, were dismayed and deeply hurt to learn that the UN and their own government were anxious to sweep the episode under the carpet to protect the reputation and to conceal the failures of the UN in preparing for combat and liberating Company A.

Cruise O'Brien wrote immediately about his experiences in The Observer of London and in The New York Times on 10 and 17 December 1961. Armed with the archive material, one expert concluded Hammarskjöld "knew in advance that the UN was about to take action in Katanga and he authorised that action". This is contradicted in a 2022 book on the Congo crisis by historian Wilhelm Agrell.

Dismissal
Faced with the failure of Operation Morthor, Hammarskjöld went to Élisabethville to meet Tshombe to discuss a ceasefire, but was killed when his airplane crashed during the journey. Cruise O'Brien wrote: "in Élisabethville I do not think there was anyone who believed that his death was an accident".

A UN crisis ensued, and Cruise O'Brien was forced to step down simultaneously from his UN position and the Irish diplomatic service in late 1961. He went public immediately with his version of events, writing simultaneously in the Observer (London) and the New York Times that, "My resignation from the United Nations and from the Irish foreign service is a result of British government policy". Michael Ignatieff asserted that Hammarskjöld, who was killed in Katanga in a suspicious plane crash prior to O'Brien's departure, had misjudged O'Brien's abilities as UN representative. He further observed that O'Brien's use of military force provided the Soviets and the US with ammunition in their campaign against the UN Secretary General and against UN actions in opposition to the interests of the big powers. That thesis was later shown to be inaccurate by the documentary CONGO 1961, made for Irish television station TG4, which showed that Hammarskjöld himself had ordered the military actions and left Cruise O'Brien to take the blame when they failed.

Documents on Irish Foreign Policy 1957-1961 (2018), included 1961 correspondence in which Frederick Boland, Ireland's ambassador to the UN, said that he had been told by Ralph Bunche, Under-Secretary-General of the United Nations for special political affairs, that Cruise O'Brien had been "given the green light" for the seizure of the Post Office and the Radio Station.

Opposition to the Vietnam War
After Cruise O'Brien's recall from UN service and his resignation from the Irish civil service, he served as Vice-Chancellor of the University of Ghana. He resigned after he fell out with the Chancellor and President of Ghana, Kwame Nkrumah, in 1965. He was initially sympathetic towards Nkrumah, who won Ghana's independence from the British empire in 1957, but fell out with him due to his authoritarianism and his promotion of the ideology of 'Nkrumahism', in which all Ghanaians were expected to believe. Cruise O'Brien sought to protect academic freedom against Nkrumahism, saying in a speech before the students of the University of Ghana that all intellectuals have a duty to promote the truth and that "These are not European values; these are universal values."

He was then appointed Albert Schweitzer Professor of Humanities at New York University, a position he held until 1969. During the 1960s O'Brien was an active opponent of US involvement in Vietnam. He supported the right of the Vietnamese people to use violence against US armed forces. At a 1967 Vietnam War symposium O'Brien clashed with Hannah Arendt, who had remarked, "As to the Viet Cong terror, we cannot possibly agree with it". O'Brien responded, "I think there is a distinction between the use of terror by oppressed peoples against the oppressors and their servants, in comparison with the use of terror by their oppressors in the interests of further oppression. I think there is a qualitative distinction there which we have the right to make." 

Besides the Vietnam War, Cruise O'Brien opposed what he saw as the overtly too passive opposition of the U.S. government to the white supremacist governments of Rhodesia and South Africa, charging that all the reaction the U.S. government ever made was to politely deplore the policies of the two governments. In September 1967, he flew to the self-proclaimed Republic of Biafra to express his support for Ibo separatism. In articles in The Observer and The New York Review of Books, he argued that there were important differences between the Republic of Biafra and the State of Katanga, and that there was no equivalence between the two breakaway states. He argued that Biafra represented the sincere wish of the Ibo people to leave Nigeria, while Katanga was a sham. 

In December 1967, Cruise O'Brien was front-page news in The Irish Times, which reported his arrest while demonstrating against the war in New York, and his being kicked by a policeman. He joked about the policeman who assaulted him: "no prizes for guessing his ethnicity". In 1968, he campaigned for Senator Eugene McCarthy who sought the Democratic nomination in the presidential election of that year on a platform of ending the Vietnam War. In May of that year, Cruise O'Brien condemned police attacks on and harassment of the militant, armed, Black Panther Party.

Between January and March 1969, he offered refuge at his home in Howth to German socialist student leader, and anti-Vietnam War activist, Rudi Dutschke and his wife Gretchen. In April the previous year Dutschke had been shot and badly injured by a right-wing assassin in West Berlin, but was subsequently denied visas by a number of European countries, including Britain. During their stay, the Dutschkes were visited by their lawyer Horst Mahler, who tried and failed to persuade them to support him underground in the group that was to become the Red Army Faction (the "Baader Meinhof Gang").

Irish politics
Cruise O'Brien returned to Ireland and in the 1969 general election was elected to Dáil Éireann as a member of the opposition Labour Party in Dublin North-East, taking the second of that constituency's four seats behind Fianna Fail Minister for Finance Charles Haughey, whose probity in financial matters he questioned. He was appointed a member of the short-lived first delegation from the Oireachtas to the European Parliament. After the 1973 general election, Cruise O'Brien was appointed Minister for Posts and Telegraphs in the 1973–77 Labour-Fine Gael coalition under Taoiseach Liam Cosgrave.

After the outbreak of armed conflict in Northern Ireland in 1969, Cruise O'Brien developed a deep hostility to militant Irish republicanism and to Irish nationalists generally in Northern Ireland, which reversed the views that he articulated at the outset of the unrest. He also reversed his opposition to broadcasting censorship imposed by the previous government, by extending and vigorously enforcing censorship of Raidió Teilifís Éireann (RTÉ) under Section 31 of the Broadcasting Act. In 1976, he specifically banned spokespersons for Sinn Féin and the Provisional Irish Republican Army from RTÉ. At the same time, he unsuccessfully attempted to have Britain's BBC 1 broadcast on Ireland's proposed second television channel, instead of allowing RTÉ to run it.

Two additional notable incidents affected Cruise O'Brien's career as minister, besides his support for broadcasting censorship.

In August 1976, Bernard Nossiter of The Washington Post interviewed him on the passage of an Emergency Powers Bill. During the course of the interview, Cruise O'Brien revealed an intention to extend censorship beyond broadcasting. He wished to "cleanse the culture" of republicanism and said that he would like the bill to be used against teachers who allegedly glorified Irish revolutionaries. He also wanted it used against newspaper editors who published pro-republican or anti-British readers' letters. Cruise O'Brien mentioned The Irish Press as a newspaper against which he particularly hoped to use the legislation against and produced a file of Irish Press letters to the editor to which he took exception. Nossiter immediately informed The Irish Press editor Tim Pat Coogan of Cruise O'Brien's intentions. Coogan printed Nossiter's report (as did The Irish Times), republished the letters to which Cruise O'Brien objected and ran a number of strong editorials attacking Cruise O'Brien and the proposed legislation. The interview caused huge controversy and resulted in the modification of the measure appearing to target newspapers.

Cruise O'Brien also supported Garda Síochána brutality from 1973 to 1977, but that was not revealed by Cruise O'Brien until 1998 in his Memoir. In Memoir: My Life and Themes, Cruise O'Brien recalled a conversation with a detective who told him how the Gardaí had found out from a suspect the location of businessman Tiede Herrema, who had been kidnapped by group of maverick republicans in October 1975: "the escort started asking him questions and when at first he refused to answer, they beat the shit out of him. Then he told them where Herrema was"."/ Cruise O'Brien explained, "I refrained from telling this story to [ministerial colleagues] Garret [FitzGerald] or Justin [Keating], because I thought it would worry them. It didn't worry me". Elements of the Garda that engaged in beating false confessions out of suspects quickly became known as the "Heavy Gang".

Cruise O'Brien's Dublin North-East constituency was re-drawn and renamed as part of his Labour colleague James Tully's attempt as Minister for Local Government to design boundaries in the electoral interests of the coalition partners. The plan backfired. In the 1977 general election, he stood in Dublin Clontarf and was one of three ministers (the others being Justin Keating and Patrick Cooney) defeated in a rout of the outgoing administration. He was, however, subsequently elected to Seanad Éireann in 1977 from the Dublin University constituency. He was dropped as Labour's Northern Ireland spokesperson. O'Brien resigned his seat in 1979 because of new commitments as editor-in-chief of The Observer newspaper in London.

Editor-in-Chief at The Observer
Between 1978 and 1981, Cruise O'Brien was editor-in-chief of The Observer newspaper in Britain. In 1979 he controversially refused to publish an Observer article by Mary Holland, the paper's Ireland correspondent. Holland, whose reporting won her a Journalist of the Year award, had been one of the first journalists to explain discrimination in Northern Ireland to a British audience. The article was a profile of Mary Nelis of Derry and dealt with her radicalisation as a result of the conflict. Cruise O'Brien objected and sent Holland a memo stating that the "killing strain" of Irish republicanism "has a very high propensity to run in families and the mother is most often the carrier". The memo continued, "It is a very serious weakness of your coverage of Irish affairs that you are a very poor judge of Irish Catholics. That gifted and talkative community includes some of the most expert conmen and conwomen in the world and I believe you have been conned". Holland was forced out of the newspaper by Cruise O'Brien. She later joined The Irish Times as a columnist. She also rejoined The Observer after Cruise O'Brien's departure in 1981.

Unionism
In 1985, Cruise O'Brien supported unionist objections to the inter-governmental Anglo-Irish Agreement. In 1996 he joined Robert McCartney's United Kingdom Unionist Party (UKUP) and was elected to the Northern Ireland Forum. In 1997, a successful libel action was brought against him by relatives of Bloody Sunday victims for alleging in a Sunday Independent article in 1997 that the marchers were "Sinn Féin activists operating for the IRA". Cruise O'Brien opposed the 1998 Good Friday Agreement and opposed allowing Sinn Féin into government in Northern Ireland. He wrote that he was "glad to be an ally … in defence of the Union" with the Reverend Ian Paisley, leader of the Free Presbyterian Church and of the Democratic Unionist Party. In 1968 O'Brien had referred to Paisley as a "hate merchant". He also predicted, mistakenly, that Paisley would not enter a power-sharing government with Sinn Féin. O'Brien later resigned from the UKUP after his book Memoir: My Life and Themes called on Unionists to consider the benefits of a united Ireland in order to thwart Sinn Féin. In 2005 he rejoined the Irish Labour Party. Cruise O'Brien defended his harsh attitudes and actions towards Irish republicans, saying "We do right to condemn all violence but we have a special duty to condemn the violence which is committed in our name".

Writings
Cruise O'Brien's many books include: States of Ireland (1972), where he first indicated his revised view of Irish nationalism, The Great Melody (1992), his 'thematic' biography of Edmund Burke, and his autobiography Memoir: My Life and Themes (1999). He also published a collection of essays, Passion and Cunning (1988), which includes a substantial piece on the literary work of William Butler Yeats and some challenging views on the subject of terrorism, and The Siege: The Saga of Israel and Zionism (1986), a history of Zionism and the State of Israel. His books, particularly those on Irish issues, tend to be personalised, for example States of Ireland, where he made the link between the political success of the republican Easter Rising and the consequent demise of his Home Rule family's position in society. His private papers have been deposited in the University College Dublin Archives.

In 1963, Cruise O'Brien's script for a Telefís Éireann programme on Charles Stewart Parnell won him a Jacob's Award.

He was a longtime columnist for the Irish Independent. His articles were distinguished by hostility to the Northern Ireland peace process, regular predictions of civil war involving the Republic of Ireland, and a pro-Unionist stance.

Cruise O'Brien held visiting professorships and lectureships throughout the world, particularly in the United States, and controversially in apartheid South Africa, openly breaking the academic boycott. A persistent critic of Charles Haughey, Cruise O'Brien coined the acronym GUBU (Grotesque, Unbelievable, Bizarre and Unprecedented), based on a statement by Charles Haughey, who was then Taoiseach, commenting on the discovery of a murder suspect, Malcolm MacArthur, in the apartment of the Fianna Fáil Attorney General Patrick Connolly. Until 1994, Cruise O'Brien was a Pro-Chancellor of the University of Dublin.

According to Roy Foster, Colm Tóibín wrote that Seamus Heaney "was so popular that he could even survive being endorsed by Conor Cruise O’Brien, which normally meant 'the kiss of death' in Ireland. The legendary The New Yorker fact-checking desk, unable to let a single statement go uncorroborated, found out Cruise O'Brien's Dublin phone number, and called it to inquire if his approval meant the kiss of death in his native country: they then telephoned an astonished Tóibín and reproachfully told him: 'Mr O'Brien said: "No, it didn't".'"

Bibliography

 Maria Cross: Imaginative Patterns in a Group of Modern Catholic Writers (as Donat O'Donnell) (London: Chatto & Windus, 1952) OCLC 7884093
 Parnell and His Party 1880–90 (Oxford: Clarendon Press, 1957)  (1968 edition)
The Shaping of Modern Ireland (London: Routledge & Kegan Paul, 1960)
 To Katanga and Back: A UN Case History (London: Hutchinson, 1962) OCLC 460615937
 Writers and Politics: Essays & Criticism (London: Chatto & Windus, 1965)  (1976 Penguin edition)
 Introduction and notes to Edmund Burke's Reflections on the Revolution in France (London: Penguin Books, 1968, 2004) 
 Murderous Angels: A Political Tragedy and Comedy in Black and White (play) (Boston: Little, Brown, 1968) OCLC 449739
 The United Nations: Sacred Drama with illustrations by Feliks Topolski (London: Hutchinson, 1968) 
 Camus (Fontana Modern Masters, 1970)  – released in US as Albert Camus of Europe and Africa (New York: Viking, 1970) 
 (with Máire O'Brien) A Concise History of Ireland (London: Thames & Hudson, 1972); retitled The Story of Ireland (New York: Viking, 1972)
 States of Ireland (London: Hutchinson, 1972) 
 The Suspecting Glance (London: Faber, 1972) 
 Herod: Reflections on Political Violence (London: Hutchinson, 1978) 
 The Siege: The Saga of Israel and Zionism (1986) 
 God Land: Reflections on Religion and Nationalism (Cambridge, MA: Harvard University Press, 1988) 
 Passion and Cunning and Other Essays (London: Weidenfeld & Nicolson, 1988) 
 The Great Melody: A Thematic Biography of Edmund Burke (Chicago: University of Chicago Press, 1992) 
 On the Eve of the Millennium (Toronto: House of Anansi Press, 1994). 
 The Long Affair: Thomas Jefferson and the French Revolution, 1785–1800 (Chicago: University of Chicago Press, 1996) 
 Ancestral Voices: Religion and Nationalism in Ireland (Dublin: Poolbeg Press, 1994) 
 Memoir: My Life and Themes (Dublin: Poolbeg Press, 1999)

References
 
 
 
 
 
 Meehan Niall (2017). The Embers of Revisionism, Critiquing Creationist Irish History, AHS, 2017.

Citations

External links

 Obituary, The New York Times, 19 December 2008
 "Arrested development: Conor Cruise O’Brien, 1917–2008", Niall Meehan, History Ireland, Vol 17, No. 2, March-April 2009
 "Conor Cruise O'Brien, the irascible angel", Neal Ascherson, Open Democracy, December 2008
 
 Cruise O'Brien article archive and author page from The New York Review of Books
 
 "Conor Cruise O'Brien: A Centennial Appraisal", lecture by Frank Callanan, November 2017
 "The Polariser", debating Conor Cruise O'Brien, Frank Callinan, Niall Meehan, Phillip O'Connor

1917 births
2008 deaths
Alumni of Trinity College Dublin
The Atlantic (magazine) people
Catholic Unionists
Independent members of Seanad Éireann
Irish Independent people
Irish diplomats
Irish officials of the United Nations
Irish writers
Jacob's Award winners
Labour Party (Ireland) MEPs
Labour Party (Ireland) TDs
MEPs for the Republic of Ireland 1973
Members of Seanad Éireann for Dublin University
Members of the 14th Seanad
Members of the 19th Dáil
Members of the 20th Dáil
Members of the Northern Ireland Forum
People educated at Sandford Park School
People from Rathmines
People of the Congo Crisis
Revisionist historians (Ireland)
Scholars of Trinity College Dublin
UK Unionist Party politicians
Historians of the Land War
Vice-Chancellors of the University of Ghana
New York University people